William Semple may refer to:
 William Semple (footballer) (1861–1940), Scottish footballer
 William F. Semple, American dentist, commonly referred to as the first person to patent a chewing gum
 Billy Semple (born 1946), Scottish footballer.

See also
 William Sempill, 2nd Lord Sempill, Scottish lord